I'm the One is an album by Roberta Flack released in May 1982 which reached #59 on the album chart in Billboard whose R&B album chart afforded the album a #16 peak.

The Burt Bacharach/Carole Bayer Sager-produced "Making Love", which appeared in the film of the same name and in the spring of 1982 had afforded Flack her final solo Top 40 hit (#13 on the Billboard Hot 100), was included on the I'm the One album along with eight new tracks co-produced by William Eaton, Ralph MacDonald, William Salter and Flack herself.

The track "I'm the One," given parallel single release with the album, peaked at #42 on the Hot 100 where it marked Flack's final solo appearance, although she'd return to the Hot 100 in 1983 with the duets "Tonight, I Celebrate My Love" (#16) and "You're Looking Like Love to Me" (#58) (both with Peabo Bryson) and again in 1991 with "Set the Night to Music" (with Maxi Priest/ #6).

A third single from the I'm the One album: "In the Name of Love", reached #24 on the Billboard Adult Contemporary chart.

Track listing
"I'm the One" (William Eaton, Ralph MacDonald, William Salter) - 4:05 Single 2 A-side
"'Till the Morning Comes" (Casey Daniels, Ralph MacDonald, William Salter) - 3:54 Single 2 B-side
"Love and Let Love" (William Eaton, Ralph MacDonald, William Salter) - 4:34
"Never Loved Before" (Bobby Caldwell, Henry Grumpo Marx) - 3:58
"In the Name of Love" (Ralph MacDonald, William Salter, Bill Withers) - 4:00 Single 3 A-side
"Ordinary Man" (Peabo Bryson) - 4:26
"Making Love" (Burt Bacharach, Bruce Roberts, Carole Bayer Sager) - 3:43 Single 1 A-side
"Happiness" (Harriet Schock, William D. Smith) - 3:22 Single 3 B-side
"My Love for You" (Brenda Russell, William D. Smith) - 3:22

Personnel 
 Roberta Flack – lead vocals
 Richard Tee – Fender Rhodes (1-6, 7, 8, 9), acoustic piano (7)
 Paul Griffin – Oberheim OB-X (1-6, 8, 9)
 Burt Bacharach – synthesizers (7)
 Craig Hundley – synthesizers (7)
 Eric Gale – guitars (1-6, 8, 9)
 Lee Ritenour – guitars (7)
 Marcus Miller – bass (1-6, 8, 9)
 Neil Stubenhaus – bass (7)
 Steve Gadd – drums (1, 2, 3, 5, 6, 8, 9)
 Buddy Williams – drums (4)
 Jim Keltner – drums (7)
 Ralph MacDonald – percussion (1-6, 8, 9)
 Paulinho da Costa – percussion (7)
 Grover Washington Jr. – soprano  sax solo (5, 9)
 Vivian Cherry – backing vocals
 Kasey Cisyk – backing vocals
 William Eaton – backing vocals, all arrangements 
 Frank Floyd – backing vocals
 Diva Gray – backing vocals
 Zachary Sanders – backing vocals

Production 
 William Eaton – producer (1-6, 8, 9)
 Roberta Flack – producer (1-6, 8, 9)
 Ralph MacDonald – producer (1-6, 8, 9)
 William Salter – producer (1-6, 8, 9)
 Burt Bacharach – producer (7)
 Carole Bayer Sager – producer (7)
 Renee Bell – production coordinator 
 Janaire Boger – production coordinator 
 Jacklyn Brown – production coordinator 
 Kirk D. Fancher – production coordinator 
 Richard Alderson – engineer (1-6, 8, 9)
 Carla Bandini – engineer (1-6, 8, 9)
 Mike Bradley – engineer (1-6, 8, 9)
 Ollie Cotton – engineer (1-6, 8, 9)
 Ed Rak – engineer (1-6, 8, 9)
 Elliot Scheiner – engineer (1-6, 8, 9), remixing 
 Bruce Swedien – engineer (7)
 Kendall Brown – assistant engineer (1-6, 8, 9)
 Eddie Heath – assistant engineer (1-6, 8, 9)
 Anthony McDonald – assistant engineer (1-6, 8, 9)
 Lamont Moreno – assistant engineer (1-6, 8, 9)
 Bob Defrin – art direction, design 
 Kinko Y. Craft – illustration

Charts

Weekly charts

Year-end charts

References

Roberta Flack albums
1982 albums
Albums produced by Burt Bacharach
Atlantic Records albums